The 1946–47 season was the 67th season of competitive football in England.

Overview
The 1946–47 season was the first to feature a full football programme since the 1938–39 campaign. Eighty-eight teams competed over four divisions. Liverpool went top of the First Division with a 2–1 away win over Wolverhampton Wanderers on 31 May 1947.  Wolves could have clinched their first league title with a victory in that match, but instead the title was won by Liverpool for the fifth time.  Due to a bitter winter that postponed many fixtures Liverpool had to wait until the match between Stoke City and Sheffield United on 14 June.  A win for Stoke would see them take the title on goal average; however, Sheffield United prevailed 2–1 to give Liverpool its fifth league championship.

Events
The season commenced on 31 August 1946. The largest crowd of the day was 61,000 at Stamford Bridge where Chelsea beat Bolton Wanderers 4–3. Aggregate attendance was 950,000 for the 43 matches – the match between Newport County and Southampton was postponed due to floods.

In September, Scottish International Inside-forward, Tommy Walker, joined Chelsea from Hearts for £6,000 (2010: £). By 14 September most teams had averaged five games with only Manchester United and Doncaster Rovers maintaining a 100% record. By 23 September, only Barnsley, Manchester City, Rotherham United and Queens Park Rangers remained unbeaten.

On 5 October Newcastle United created a Second Division record, scoring 13 against Newport County. New signing Len Shackleton scored five.

In 1946 Sparta Prague toured Great Britain opening with a 2–2 draw against Arsenal on 2 October before losing 3–1 to Birmingham City.

Honours

Notes = Number in parentheses is the times that club has won that honour. * indicates new record for competition

Football League

First Division
The first post-war season saw Liverpool win out in one of the most dramatic finishes to any title race; needing to beat Wolverhampton Wanderers in order to wrestle the title away from them, they walked away with a 2–1 win, and their first league title since 1923. However, the surprise package of the season were Manchester United, as Matt Busby's appointment as manager had an immediate impact and brought them a second-place finish, their highest since their last title win in 1911, with the intervening decades generally only having seen mid-table finishes combined with occasional spells in Division Two; it would prove to be just the start of two decades of immense success under the new manager's leadership. Wolves finished third, having led the table for much of the season, before being undone by a late loss of form. Despite finishing fourth, Stoke City had the opportunity to snatch the title away from Liverpool, due to their final game of the season being delayed by almost two weeks; a loss to Sheffield United ended their hopes, however.

At the bottom, Leeds United were relegated in bottom place, ultimately being cost dear by abysmal away form that saw them earn just one point away from Elland Road, and returning to the Second Division after 15 years. Brentford went down after five seasons in Division One; they would ultimately not return to the top-flight until 2021.

Second Division
Manchester City won promotion back to the top-flight at the second attempt, closely followed by Burnley, who returned to Division One for the first time since 1930.

Newport County's first season in the second tier (not counting the abandoned 1939–40 season) ended in immediate relegation, with the club shipping a staggering 133 goals; it would ultimately prove this incarnation of the club's only season at this level before its dissolution in 1989. Fellow Welsh club Swansea Town were also relegated.

Third Division North
Doncaster Rovers were promoted to the Second Division, beating out South Yorkshire rivals Rotherham United, whose own record would have been enough for promotion in most years.

Southport and Halifax Town were both re-elected to the Football League.

Third Division South
Cardiff City won the division, meaning that they passed two of their Welsh rivals, Swansea and Newport, on their way up to the Second Division.

Norwich City and Mansfield Town were both re-elected, though Mansfield were transferred to the Third Division North for the following season.

Top goalscorers

First Division
Dennis Westcott (Wolverhampton) – 38 goals

Second Division
Charlie Wayman (Newcastle) – 30 goals

Third Division North
Clarrie Jordan (Doncaster Rovers) – 42 goals

Third Division South
Don Clark (Bristol City) – 36 goals

References